Seaco Srl is a company that sells and leases marine containers. It was formed as GE SeaCo in 1998 as a joint venture between General Electric and Sea Containers. Sea Containers filed for Chapter 11 bankruptcy protection in 2006, and its interests including the stake in GE SeaCo were transferred to a new company, SeaCo Ltd. SeaCo Ltd sold GE SeaCo, renamed Seaco Srl, to HNA Group in 2011.

Seaco is owned by the Bermuda-based Global Sea Containers Ltd., which is itself indirectly owned by Bohai Leasing. HNA Group own the majority of shares in Bohai Leasing, which is listed on the Shenzhen Stock Exchange.

See also
 Textainer Group Holdings
 Largest container shipping companies
 Largest international container leasing companies list

References

External links
 

Transport companies established in 1998
Container shipping companies